Candler is an unincorporated community in Marion County, Florida, United States. It is located on County Road 464 between Silver Springs Shores and Lake Weir. The community is part of the Ocala Metropolitan Statistical Area. Candler's Zip Code is 32111.

Geography
Candler is located at  (29.071 -81.968).

History
Candler is a post-Civil War-era town.

The plat of Candler dates to 1883/4, and the town is named for John W. Candler, then president of the Florida Southern Railway.

Gallery

References

External links

Unincorporated communities in Marion County, Florida
Unincorporated communities in Florida